Joseph Gartshore Kissock (5 June 1893 – 1 September 1959) was a Scottish-born association football player who represented New Zealand at international level.

He played for Vale of Clyde in his native Scotland, before moving to England in 1919 to join Bury. He spent a year with Bristol Rovers during the 1921–22 season, and after a brief spell back in Scotland with Peebles Rovers, he moved to the United States in 1922. He stayed in America for a year, and moved to New Zealand in 1923. Here, he played for Porirua team Hospital.

Kissock made his full All Whites debut in a 1–2 loss to Australia on 9 June 1923 and played two further official internationals that month, beating Australia 3-2 and 4–1. These were to be his only official internationals for New Zealand.

He died in San Francisco in September 1959.

References

1893 births
1959 deaths
People from Saltcoats
New Zealand association footballers
New Zealand international footballers
Association football defenders
English Football League players
Bury F.C. players
Bristol Rovers F.C. players
Peebles Rovers F.C. players
British emigrants to New Zealand